NGC 941 is an intermediate spiral galaxy in the constellation Triangulum. It is an estimated 55 million light-years from the Milky Way and has a diameter of approximately 55,000 light years. The galaxies NGC 926, NGC 934, NGC 936, NGC 955 are located in the same sky area. NGC 941 was discovered by the astronomer William Herschel using on 6 January 1785.

SN 2005ad, a type II supernova, occurred in NGC 941.

References

External links
 

Intermediate spiral galaxies
0941
Triangulum (constellation)
009414